School Cricketers Of The Year Award is an award given to school cricketers in Sri Lanka. It was first awarded by the patronage of Warner-Hudunut Ltd in 1978 and The Sunday Observer newspaper by Associated Newspapers of Ceylon Limited has been sponsoring the award since 1979 in collaboration with other companies such as Mobitel (Sri Lanka), Bata Shoes, and Warner-Hudnut. So far seven players have been able to win the award twice. Almost all the players that have won this awards went on to join the Sri Lanka national cricket team.

References

1978 establishments in Sri Lanka
Annual events in Sri Lanka
Cricket in Sri Lanka
Sri Lankan sports trophies and awards